The  Cleveland Gladiators season was the 14th season for the franchise in the Arena Football League, and the fifth while in Cleveland. The team was coached by Steve Thonn and played their home games at the Quicken Loans Arena.

Final roster

Standings

Regular season schedule
The Gladiators began the season by hosting the Spokane Shock on March 24. They closed the regular season on July 27, on the road against the Utah Blaze.

References

Cleveland Gladiators
Cleveland Gladiators seasons
Cleve